Hilary Liftin is an American author, born in New York City in 1969.

Career
Liftin is most notable for her ghost-writing and co-writing of celebrity memoirs and novels, including Tori Spelling's memoirs Stori Telling, Mommywood and Uncharted Territori and her children's book, Presenting... Tallulah. She has also worked on Miley Cyrus' memoir Miles To Go, and Teri Hatcher's Burnt Toast: And Other Philosophies Of Life.  Several of her collaborations have charted on the "New York Times Bestsellers List".

Liftin worked in the book publishing industry for ten years before becoming a ghost/co-writer. She has also published three books of her own. Her first, published on April 27, 1999 by Vintage Books, was co-written with her close friend and former college-roommate Kate Montgomery.  Titled Dear Exile: The True Story of Two Friends Separated (for a Year) by an Ocean, the book is a collection of letters they wrote to one another over a year-long period, while Montgomery was on assignment in rural Kenya with the Peace Corps, and Hilary, in Manhattan, New York, first pursuing her career. Her second book, Candy and Me: A Love Story (2003, Free Press) is a memoir about her lifelong obsession with candy and other sweet things. Liftin's most recent work, Movie Star by Lizzie Pepper (2015, Viking), is the story of a young television actress who gets seduced by a Hollywood megastar and sucked into his religious cult. After a few years into their heavily chronicled marriage, she runs for her life, right onto Broadway. In a New York Times interview, Liftin said she "wrote the celebrity memoir of my fantasies."

Liftin lives with her husband, Chris Harris, a television writer, in Los Angeles.

Bibliography 
 Hilary Liftin and Kate Montgomery (as co-written) (1999) Dear Exile: The True Story of Two Friends Separated (for a year) by an Ocean; Vintage Books
 Liftin, Hilary (2003) Candy and Me: A Love Story Free Press
 Hatcher, Teri and Liftin, Hilary (co-written) (2006) Burnt Toast: And Other Philosophies of Life; Hyperion Books
 Walsh, Peter (ghost written) It's All Too Much: An Easy Plan for Living a Richer Life with Less Stuff (2006) Free Press
Spelling, Tori and Liftin, Hilary (co-written) (2008) Stori Telling; Simon Spotlight Entertainment/Simon Schuster. Received 2009 Bravo A-List Award for Best Celebrity Autobiography.
Walsh, Peter (Ghost-written) (2008) Does This Clutter Make My Butt Look Fat?: An Easy Plan for Losing Weight and Living More Free Press
Cyrus, Miley and Liftin, Hilary (co-written) (2009) Miles To Go; Hyperion Books
Spelling, Tori and Liftin, Hilary (co-written) (2009) Mommywood Simon Spotlight Entertainment/Simon Schuster
Phillips, Mackenzie and Liftin, Hilary (Co-written) (2009) High On Arrival. Simon Spotlight Entertainment/Simon Schuster
Walsh, Peter (Ghost-written) (2009) Enough Already: Clearing Mental Clutter to Become the Best You. Free Press
Spelling, Tori and Liftin, Hilary (co-written) (2010) Unchartered Territori. Simon Spotlight Entertainment/Simon Schuster
Spelling, Tori and Liftin, Hilary (contributor ) (2010) Presenting...Tallulah; Illustrated by Vanessa Brantley Newton; Aladdin
O'Neal, Tatum and Liftin, Hilary (co-written) (2011) "Found: A Daughter's Journey Home"; William Morrow.
 Liftin, Hilary (2015) "Movie Star by Lizzie Pepper"; Viking.

References 

Living people
1969 births
Ghostwriters
Writers from New York City
20th-century American writers
20th-century American women writers
21st-century American writers
21st-century American women writers